Hume is a soil type that is well drained and slowly permeable. Hume is formed from the erosion of shale and sandstone. Hume soils occur naturally on slopes and alluvial fans.

See also 

 Loam

Notes and references 
 Hume series description

Pedology
Types of soil